Vascular endothelial growth factor B also known as VEGF-B is a protein that, in humans, is encoded by the VEGF-B gene.  VEGF-B is a growth factor that belongs to the vascular endothelial growth factor family, of which VEGF-A is the best-known member.

Function 

In contrast to VEGF-A, VEGF-B plays a less pronounced  role in the vascular system: Whereas VEGF-A is important for the formation of blood vessels, such as during development or in pathological conditions, VEGF-B seems to play a role only in the maintenance of newly formed blood vessels during pathological conditions. 
VEGF-B plays also an important role on several types of neurons. It is important for the protection of neurons in the retina  and the cerebral cortex during stroke and of motoneurons during motor neuron diseases such as amyotrophic lateral sclerosis.

VEGF-B exerts its effects via the FLT1 receptor.

VEGF-B has also been found to control endothelial uptake and transport of fatty acids in heart and skeletal muscle.

Interactions 

Vascular endothelial growth factor B has been shown to interact with FLT1.

References

Further reading

External links 
 PDBe-KB provides an overview of all the structure information available in the PDB for Human Vascular endothelial growth factor B